Charidotella egregia is a species of leaf beetle described by Carl Henrik Boheman in 1855.  Along with Charidotella sexpunctata, it is known as a golden tortoise beetle.

References

Beetles described in 1855
Cassidinae